Flemingtown is an unincorporated community in Dickenson County, Virginia, in the United States.

History
Flemingtown was named for the Fleming family of pioneer settlers.

References

Unincorporated communities in Dickenson County, Virginia
Unincorporated communities in Virginia